Connecticut's 125th House of Representatives district elects one member of the Connecticut House of Representatives. It encompasses parts of New Canaan and Wilton and has been represented by Republican Tom O'Dea since 2013.

List of representatives

Recent elections

2022

2020

2018

2016

2014

2012

References

125